Le Lyrial is a cruise ship built by Fincantieri in Ancona, Italy, for Compagnie du Ponant. It was delivered on 11 April 2015, and operated its inaugural cruise in May 2015.

The name of the ship refers to the Lyra constellation in the northern hemisphere.

Architecture and equipment

Accommodation
Le Lyrial has 122 cabins and suites. All of them have sea views, and 94 percent feature a private balcony. An entire deck of the ship is devoted solely to suites, some of which larger than those on the vessel's three older sister ships.

Machinery and technology
According to Fincantieri, Le Lyrial is equipped with the latest environmentally-friendly technology, such as an energy-saving LED lighting system.  Additionally, Le Lyrial has such low levels of vibration and noise that it has been categorised as "Comfort Class" by its classification society, Bureau Veritas.

References

External links

 Compagnie du Ponant official site page about the ship

2015 ships
Ships built in Ancona
Ships built by Fincantieri
Ships of Compagnie du Ponant